Network is an Indian Bengali language thriller film, starring Saswata Chatterjee, Sabyasachi Chakraborty, Rini Ghosh, Bhaskar Banerjee, Indrajit Mazumder, Saptarshi Roy, Kartikey Tripathi, Eshani Ghosh, Saayoni Ghosh and Anindya Chatterjee, Darshana Banik. The film is the debut feature of director Saptaswa Basu who has co-written the screenplay with Rini Ghosh. This is the first Bengali feature film to feature a song of the RnB genre which is composed and sung by Raz Dee. The promotional track of this film is sung by Shaan and composed by Dabbu. The other songs are composed by Chirantan Banerjee and Aviraj Sen.

The film was theatrically released on 28 June 2019.

Plot

Abhijit Ganguly [Saswata Chatterjee] is a film director who has long lost his fame. After his daughter's death he has turned into a walking shadow, who is recognized by no one. When he gets to know about his terminal disease which will allow him to live only for one more year, he decides to put in all his own resources to make a new film and make a comeback to regain his lost fame. He helped by his lawyer friend Subrata (Bhaskar Bannerjee), teams up with a group of talented actors and production management team including Raj and Shreya, who become very trusted to him. However, he gets betrayed by these very associates and is left ruined. His arch rival Arindam (Sabyasachi Chakraborty) induces Raj n Shreya to sell the script and offers them the role of hero and heroine. Broken Abhijit has no way out so with his last ditch effort
He creates a reality TV show named "Their Life", a unique show which deals with celebrity lifestyle. Through this show, he starts exploring and exposing Raj, Sreya and Arindam to take revenge on the persons who betrayed him one by one.

Cast
 Saswata Chatterjee as Abhijit Ganguly 
 Sabyasachi Chakraborty as Arindam Chakraborty
 Rini Ghosh as Shreya
 Indrajit Mazumder as Raj
 Kartikey Tripathi as Subho
 Bhaskar Banerjee as Subrata
 Eshani Ghosh as Puja
 Saayoni Ghosh as Priyanka (special appearance)
 Saptarshi Roy as Arjun Chatterjee
 Akshay Kapoor as Mr. Agarwal
 Anindya Chatterjee as Joy (special appearance)
 Darshana Banik as Prerna (special appearance)
 Rana Basu Thakur as Mr. Bose

Filming

The film commenced its principal photography in mid 2017 and was wrapped up in early 2018. It was completed in three schedules including a song schedule, with intervals in between, to give time for rough edits and re-shoot decisions. A separate schedule was planned to shoot the climax sequence. The film has been shot in Kolkata, Bakrahat, Tajpur sea beach, Purple Movie town, Moon city studios and Raichak on Ganges. A few stock shots for the TV show sequence were shot in Andaman, Goa and Bangkok.

Soundtrack

References

External links

Bengali-language Indian films
2010s Bengali-language films
2019 films
Indian thriller films
2019 thriller films